Punta Escarlata is a Spanish mystery television series that originally aired on Telecinco from 20 July to 5 September 2011.

Premise 
Two girls disappeared after attending an open-air dance in the fictional sea-side village of Punta Escarlata. 8 years later a girl from Madrid experiences a vision about the murder of the girls that leads her to the location of the corpses. Two police officers from Madrid arrive to Punta Escarlata to solve the mystery.

Cast

Production and release 

The executive producers were Pablo Barrera and Manuel Valdivia.
The series was filmed in 2009 in Altafulla, province of Tarragona. However, after the merging of the Cuatro and Telecinco's operators, the series was shelved for a while. The first episode eventually aired on Telecinco on 20 July 2011, at 23:26, attracting an audience of 2,054,000 viewers (18.6%), becoming the best fiction release on the channel since Sin tetas no hay paraíso in 2008. The broadcasting run ended on 7 September 2009, averaging a 12.8% share, slightly below the channel's average.

It premiered in the US market on 20 September 2012, aired on VME.

References 

Telecinco network series
Spanish mystery television series
Spanish-language television shows
2011 Spanish television series debuts
Television shows filmed in Spain
2011 Spanish television series endings
2010s mystery television series
2010s Spanish drama television series
Television series by Globomedia